David Stanley MacKay (January 14, 1919 – May 1, 1980) was a Canadian professional ice hockey player who played 27 games in the National Hockey League for the Chicago Black Hawks. He was born in Cardston, Alberta. He died of acute respiratory failure in 1980 at Vernon, British Columbia, where he worked as an engineer.

External links

Dave MacKay's Death Certificate

1919 births
1980 deaths
Canadian ice hockey defencemen
Chicago Blackhawks players